Thomas Fearne (November 14, 1846 – April 29, 1901) was a Canadian American immigrant, farmer, and Republican politician.  He was a member of the Wisconsin State Senate, representing the 9th Senate district from January 1899 until his death in April 1901.  He also served one term as sheriff of Waushara County, Wisconsin.

Early life
Born in Hamilton, Ontario, Canada, Fearne was educated in the public schools. In 1855, he emigranted to the United States and settled in the town of Richfield, Adams County, Wisconsin. In 1864, Fearne moved permanently to Coloma, Waushara County, Wisconsin.

Career
Fearne was a farmer. Fearne served as chairman of the Coloma Town Board for eighteen years and also served as the Coloma Town Clerk in 1891 and 1892. In 1883 and 1884, Fearne served as sheriff of Waushara County and was a Republican. From 1899 until his death in 1901, Fearne served in the Wisconsin State Senate.

Death
Fearne died suddenly on April 29, 1901 at his home in Coloma, Wisconsin of quinsy. He had returned home from attending the legislative session in Madison, Wisconsin and had felt ill.

Notes

External links

1844 births
1901 deaths
Deaths from peritonsillar abscess
Pre-Confederation Canadian emigrants to the United States
Politicians from Hamilton, Ontario
People from Coloma, Wisconsin
Farmers from Wisconsin
Mayors of places in Wisconsin
Wisconsin sheriffs
Republican Party Wisconsin state senators
Burials in Wisconsin
19th-century American politicians